International Collective in Support of Fishworkers (ICSF) is a non-government organisation that intends to be a supportive network of fish mongers.

The main objectives of ICSF are to: 
monitor issues that relate to the life, livelihood and living conditions of fishworkers around the world;
disseminate information on these issues, particularly amongst fisherfolk; 
prepare guidelines for policymakers that stress fisheries development and management of a just, participatory and sustainable nature; and
help create the space and momentum for the development of alternatives in the small-scale fisheries sector.

External links
 ICSF official site

Environmental organisations based in Belgium
Collectives
Workers' rights organizations
Fishing trade associations
Political organisations based in Belgium
Civic and political organisations of India